The 2021 NCAA Men's National Collegiate Volleyball Tournament was the 51st edition of the NCAA Men's National Collegiate Volleyball Championship, an annual tournament to determine the national champion of NCAA Division I and Division II men's collegiate indoor volleyball. The single-elimination tournament began with a play-in match. The entire tournament was hosted by Ohio State University from May 3 to 8, 2021 at Covelli Center in Columbus, Ohio. Hawaii won its first title by defeating BYU 3–0 (their 2002 title was vacated due to NCAA violations).

Bids
The tournament field was announced on NCAA.com Sunday, April 25, 2021 at 1 p.m. EDT.

Schedule and results
All times Eastern.

Tournament bracket

Game summaries
All times Eastern.

First round

Quarterfinals

Semifinals

National Championship

All Tournament Team
Rado Parapunov,  Hawai'i (Most Outstanding Player)
Patrick Gasman, Hawai'i 
Jakob Thelle, Hawai'i 
Gabi Garcia Fernandez, BYU
Wil Stanley, BYU
Casey McGarry, UC Santa Barbara
Tyler Mitchem, Lewis

References

2021
NCAA Men's Volleyball Championship
NCAA Men's Volleyball Championship
2021 NCAA Division I & II men's volleyball season